A dispersed medium consists of two media that do not mix. More specifically, it contains discrete elements of one medium which are dispersed in a continuous second medium. The two media can be of very different nature. In particular, they can be a gas, a liquid or a solid.

Many materials which we encounter during the day are dispersed media. For example, milk consists of oil drops dispersed in water, fog contains tiny water drops dispersed in air, shaving cream contains bubbles dispersed in a liquid, sand consists of solid grains in air and a kitchen sponge of bubbles dispersed in a solid.

Dispersed media are commonly classified according to the nature of the two media and the volume fraction of the dispersed medium. At very low volume fraction the dispersed objects are not in contact with each other. At intermediate volume fraction they start to be in contact (they jam). And at even higher volume fraction, the dispersed objects deform in a tight packing.

Another classification takes into account the typical size of the dispersed objects. When the objects are very small (typically < 1 micrometer), for example, one speaks of colloids.

The following table provides an overview of the main types of dispersed media.

See also:  Dispersion

Chemical mixtures